Ida Lövgren was a Swedish opera singer. She was engaged at the Royal Swedish Opera in Stockholm in 1855-56, and then in Germany. In 1860, she married the German opera singer Herrmann Cesar at the Royal Opera in Berlin. She was then engaged with her spouse in several stages in Germany, as well as in Vienna and Budapest.

References 
Fredrik August Dahlgren: Förteckning öfver svenska skådespel uppförda på Stockholms theatrar 1737-1863 och Kongl. Theatrarnes personal 1773-1863. Med flera anteckningar. 

19th-century Swedish women opera singers
Year of birth missing
Year of death missing